James Russell Ahern (born February 26, 1949) is an American professional golfer who played on the PGA Tour and the Champions Tour.

Ahern was born in Duluth, Minnesota. He attended Oklahoma State University and turned professional in 1972. He toiled in relative obscurity on the PGA Tour in the 1970s, never finishing higher than ninth in 60 tournaments. He lost his card at the end of the 1975 season.

Ahern became the head pro at the Des Moines Golf and Country Club in 1980 and five years later founded Executive Golf Ltd., a golf concierge firm that arranges weekend golf instruction retreats for high-end and Fortune 500 clients.

Ahern joined the Senior PGA Tour after turning 50 in February 1999 and has two wins on this circuit. He lives in Phoenix, Arizona.

Professional wins (5)

Regular wins (3)
1977 Minnesota PGA Championship
1982 North Dakota Open
1991 North Dakota Open

Champions Tour wins (2)

Champions Tour playoff record (1–0)

Results in senior majors
Results not in chronological order before 2008

The Senior British Open was not a Champions Tour major until 2003
DNP = did not play
CUT = missed the halfway cut
"T" indicates a tie for a place
Yellow background for top-10.

See also 
1972 PGA Tour Qualifying School graduates

References

External links

Executive Golf Ltd. - Presented by Jim Ahern

American male golfers
Oklahoma State Cowboys golfers
PGA Tour golfers
PGA Tour Champions golfers
Golfers from Phoenix, Arizona
Sportspeople from Duluth, Minnesota
1949 births
Living people